The Vijñāna-bhairava-tantra (VBT, sometimes spelled in a Hindicised way as Vigyan Bhairav Tantra) is a Shaiva Tantra, of the Kaula Trika tradition of Kashmir Shaivism. Singh notes that it is difficult to establish an exact date for the text, and it could have been written at some time from the 7th to the 8th century CE. It is also called the Śiva-jñāna-upaniṣad by Abhinavagupta.

The VBT is framed as a discourse between Bhairava (the "tremendous one", or "the terrifying") and the goddess Bhairavi in 163 Sanskrit anuṣṭubh stanzas. It briefly presents around 112 Tantric meditation methods (yuktis) or centering techniques (dhāraṇās) in very compressed form.

These practices are supposed to lead to the recognition of the true nature of Reality, the "tremendous" or "awesome" consciousness (i.e. vijñāna-bhairava). These include several variants of breath awareness, concentration on various centers in the body, non-dual awareness, mantra practice, visualizations and contemplations which make use of the senses. A prerequisite to success in any of the practices is a clear understanding of which method is most suitable to the practitioner.

Overview 
The text presents itself as containing the essence of the Rudrayamala-tantra, a Bhairava tantra that is now lost.
In the Vijñāna-bhairava-tantra (VBT), Bhairavi, the goddess (Shakti), asks Bhairava (the terrifying form of Shiva) to reveal the essence of how to realize the true nature of reality. In his answer Bhairava describes 112 ways to enter into the universal and transcendental state of consciousness. References to it appear throughout the literature of Kashmir Shaivism, indicating that it was considered to be an important text in this tradition.

The VBT describes the goal of these practices, the "true nature of reality", as follows in the Christopher Wallis translation from 2018:

According to Christopher Wallis, Bhairava and Bhairavi are also used to refer to expanded states of consciousness, with Bhairavi referring more to energetic and active (śakti) states, and Bhairava referring to still and quiescent (śūnya) states. Wallis also notes that the text exhibits a "strong Buddhist influence", and one of the most common meditations taught in the text focuses on the ‘voidness’ (śūnya) of things, such as verse 48 which offers a meditation on the body as empty space, and verses 45 and 49 which teach meditations on the empty space of the heart.

Practices 
Most of the VBT's verses are brief compressed descriptions of various practices that allow one to access the state of Bhairava consciousness. Mark Dyczkowski has classified the practices of the VBT into various main types along with the verses in which they appear:
 Practices relying on the Breath: verses 24-27, 55, 64, 154
 Kuṇḍalinī practices: 28-31, 35
 Dvādaśānta (the point twelve finger widths above the head): 50-51, [55]
 Practices focusing on the senses: 32, 36, 67, 77?, 89, 117, 136
 Sound and Mantra practices: 38-42, 90-91, 114
 Void (śūnya): 43-48, [49], 58-60, 120, 122
 Universe (or absence thereof): 53, 56-57, 95
 Body (or absence thereof): 46-48 (overlaps with Void), 52, 54, 63, 65, 93, 104, 107
 Heart/Center (hṛdayam): 49, 61, 62
 Pleasure (kama): 68-74, 96
 Light & Dark: 37, 76, 87, 88
 Sleep & Dream [& Liminal states]: 55, 75, 86
 Practice with the body: 66, 78-79, 81, 82, 83, 111
 Gazing: 80, 84, 85, 113, 119-120
 Equanimity: 100, 103, 123-4, 125-6, 129
 Knowledge/insight: 97-99, 105, 106, 112, 127, 131
 Intense sensations and emotions: 101, 115, 118
 Where the mind goes: 33, 34, 92, 94, 108, 116, 128, [138]
 The ‘magic show’: 102, 133-5, 137
 The Supreme Lord: 109-110, 121, 132

Commentaries and English translations 

The text appeared in 1918 in the Kashmir Series of Text and Studies (KSTS). The Kashmir Series published two volumes, one with a commentary in Sanskrit by Kshemaraja and Shivopadhyaya and the other with a commentary, called Kaumadi, by Ananda Bhatta.

In 1957, Paul Reps brought the text to wide attention by including a poetic English translation in his popular book Zen Flesh, Zen Bones. Reps' translation was the subject of a voluminous commentary by Osho.

As the Sanskritist Christopher Wallis writes, many of English VBT translations have been done by persons who lack training in reading Sanskrit and who lack the background of reading the sanskrit tantric texts that the VBT relies on. The result has been various poetic or free form renderings which fail to properly communicate the actual practices which are briefly outlined in the text. Two exceptions to this are Jaideva Singh's translation and Mark Dyczkowski's translation.

The various VBT translations include the following:
 
 
 
 
 Tantra Yoga: Vijnana Bhairava Tantra, by Daniel Odier
 
 
 
 
 The Book of Secrets: 112 Meditations to Discover the Mystery Within by Osho
 Vijnana Bhairava Tantra, by Mike Magee, a commentary on Jaideva Singh's translation
 
The 112 Meditations From the Book of Divine Wisdom: The Meditations from the Vijnana Bhairava Tantra, with Commentary and Guided Practice by Lee Lyon
Vigyan Bhairav Tantra: The Only Great Book of Meditation, Concentration & Self Realisation by Lord Shiva, Mohan Murari, Mohan Kumar
 Vijnana Bhairava Tantra, Insight into reality by Swami Nischalananda
 Vijnana Bhairava Tantra by Satya Narayanan Sarma Rupengunta
 Vijnana Bhairava Tantra by Christopher Wallis.
 Vijnana Bhairava Tantra by Jason Augustus Newcomb

References

Sources
Printed sources

 

 

 

 

 
 

 
 

 
 

 

 

Web-sources

Meditation
Hindu tantra
Shaivism
Indian philosophy